Future World may refer to:

 The future of Earth, as described by current scientific theory
 The afterlife, the concept that consciousness continues after death

Future World, Futureworld, or variation, may also refer to:

Film
 Futureworld, the 1976 sequel to the 1973 science fiction film Westworld
 Westworld (franchise), the franchise in which "Futureworld" takes place
 Future World (film), a science fiction film directed by James Franco

Music

Albums
 Future World (Pretty Maids album), a 1987 album by the heavy metal band Pretty Maids
 Future World (Artension album), a 2004 album by progressive metal band Artension
 Futureworld (album), a 1999 album by Trans Am
 Futureworld (soundtrack), a 1976 album for the eponymous Westworld film Futureworld

Songs
 "Future World" (Helloween song), a 1987 song by Helloween
 "Future World" (Every Little Thing song), a 1996 single album and song from the J-pop band Every Little Thing
 "Future World" (Pretty Maids song), a 1987 song by Pretty Maids from the eponymous album Future World (Pretty Maids album)
 "Future World" (Artension song), a 2004 song by Artension from the eponymous album Future World (Artension album)
 "Futureworld" (song), a 1999 song by Trans Am from the eponymous album Futureworld (album)
 "Futureworld Main Theme", a 1976 song from the eponymous Westworld film Futureworld

Other uses
 Future World, a former themed land that encompassed the northern half of Walt Disney World's Epcot theme park, since subdivided into three smaller themed lands; World Celebration, World Discovery, and World Nature
 Future World, a planned theme land in the canceled Disney WestCOT theme park
 Future Worlds, an RPG from Stellar Gaming Workshop released in 1987
 FutureWorld (Milton Keynes), a housing exhibition held in Milton Keynes in 1994

See also

 
 
 Future (disambiguation)
 World (disambiguation)
 Future Worlds Center (founded 1991) a social justice non-profit NGO
 World Future Society (founded 1966) a futurist organization
 World Future Council (founded 2007) an advocacy group "to preserve the world for future generations"
 The World Tomorrow (disambiguation)
 Tomorrow's World (disambiguation)